Jack of Diamonds is a 1967 film directed by Don Taylor filmed in Germany that was released by Metro-Goldwyn-Mayer. It stars George Hamilton in the lead role of an international cat burglar and jewel thief.

Plot
A master thief known as the Ace of Diamonds decides it's time to retire before he gets caught, so he teaches everything he knows to Jeff Hill, his protégé.

Jeff begins pulling off heists, singling out glamorous film stars like Zsa Zsa Gabor, Carroll Baker and Lilli Palmer (portraying themselves in cameo roles) and stealing their precious jewels. On a luxury liner, Jeff, now nicknamed the "Jack of Diamonds", discovers he has a competitor aboard, another burglar pulling the same kinds of thefts.

After the boat docks, Jeff goes to see the Ace, who advises him to do the same thing he did, quit while he's ahead. Jeff encounters a woman named Olga who introduces him to Nicolai, and after discovering that Olga was the other thief aboard ship, Jeff schemes with them to rob a bank vault in Paris.

They are caught, but the Ace shows up and claims responsibility for the crime, sacrificing himself for Jeff and the others. The thieves agree to return the stolen jewels, but when Jeff and Olga decide to marry, Nicolai reveals he has withheld one gem to present to Olga as a gift.

Cast
 George Hamilton as Jeff
 Joseph Cotten as the Ace
 Marie Laforêt as Olga
 Maurice Evans as Nicolai
 Zsa Zsa Gabor as herself
 Carroll Baker as herself
 Lilli Palmer as herself

Production
The 1949 Paramount film about jewel thieves, Copper Canyon, was originally known as Jack of Diamonds. It is unclear whether this film has any connection with the George Hamilton film.

The film was based on a story by the producer, Sandy Howard, who said before filming that the movie "may be reminiscent of other films, but we feel, even though we have no releasing deal as yet, that it will be different in style and its budget – $1.3 million – makes it an honest and safe bet."

The film was originally meant to be directed by Herschel Daugherty. Oscar Homolka was meant to play Nicolai but was replaced by Maurice Evans.

The plan was to film in New York for a month and then 12 weeks in Europe in Paris, the Bavarian Alps, Genoa and a Munich studio.

Producer Sandy Howard described George Hamilton before filming as "a fine actor, I'm convinced, and he's a hot commodity these days", due in part to the fact he was dating the President's daughter. Reports put his fee around this time at $100,000 a movie. He was drafted into the army but received a 3-A deferral notice on the grounds he was the sole financial provider for his mother. (Hamilton's draft deferment was highly controversial at the time because it was thought that his relationship with the president's daughter gave him preferential treatment.)

Reception
Reviews for the film were mixed to negative. In his review for the New York Times, Bosley Crowther wrote, "Unless you have a particularly urgent reason for wanting to watch George Hamilton modeling a dazzling assortment of the most beautifully cut men's clothes...you may safely skip Jack of Diamonds, which turned up in neighborhood theaters yesterday. It is strictly low-grade Topkapi done up in expensive high-style.  Roger Ebert wrote in his review, "Jack of Diamonds is a harmless exercise in how not to make a suspense adventure. I can't think of any reason to go and see it, unless you're a George Hamilton fan. He's pleasant enough, I guess.

See also
 List of American films of 1967

References

External links
 
 Jack of Diamonds at Turner Classic Movies
 
 
 Review of film at New York Times
 Review of film by Roger Ebert

1967 films
1967 crime drama films
1960s heist films
West German films
English-language German films
American crime drama films
American heist films
German heist films
Films directed by Don Taylor
Metro-Goldwyn-Mayer films
Films set in West Germany
1960s English-language films
1960s American films
1960s German films